Gasterocercini is a tribe of hidden snout weevils in the family of beetles known as Curculionidae. There are at least four genera and about eight described species in Gasterocercini.

Genera
These four genera belong to the tribe Gasterocercini:
 Cophes Champion, 1905 i c g b
 Episcirrus Kuschel, 1958 i c g b
 Hohonus Kissinger, 1964 i c g b
 Rhynchus Kissinger, 1964 i c g b
Data sources: i = ITIS, c = Catalogue of Life, g = GBIF, b = Bugguide.net

References

Further reading

 
 
 
 
 
 
 
 
 
 
 
 
 

Cryptorhynchinae